Pontins is a British company operating holiday parks in the UK, founded in 1946 by Fred Pontin. Since 2011, it has been owned by Britannia Hotels.

Pontins specialises in offering half-board and self-catering holidays featuring entertainment at resorts, or "holiday parks", as they have branded them. Accommodation is usually in the form of chalets (which Pontins calls "apartments").

Company history

Fred Pontin opened his first holiday camp in 1946 on the site of a former U.S. army base (built during World War II), at Brean Sands near Weston-super-Mare in Somerset at a cost of £23,000. Pontin formed a syndicate, in which he held 50% control, to own the camp. Within a year he had six camps. Over the years he bought more camps and personally ran them for a year, before selling them to the syndicate. He gradually expanded his empire to thirty sites.

The camps were smaller and less expensive than Butlin's holiday camps. Pontins had Bluecoats to entertain their guests, as opposed to Butlins Redcoats. Among the Bluecoats were Shane Richie, Bobby Davro, Bradley Walsh, Nick Wilton, Lee Mack and Carol Lee Scott (who later played "Grotbags").

In 1978, the company was sold to Coral for £56 million. In 1980, Coral (including Pontins) was taken over by Bass Brewing, who sold Pontins in 1987 to a management buyout team led by Trevor Hemmings. It was sold again in 1989, to Scottish & Newcastle.

Over the next ten years, the company closed or sold off multiple sites. In a three-year programme in the mid-1990s, the remaining camps were modernised. By 2000, the company was operating only eight camps, and was sold back to Hemmings. In 2008, the company was sold to Ocean Parcs for £46 million. Wall Park holiday centre was not included in the sale. 

In January 2009, Pontins announced the closure of its Hemsby holiday centre. Pontins Blackpool in Squires Gate closed in October 2009 and was subsequently demolished after being acquired by property developer Persimmon, leaving only five parks still operating under the Pontins brand.

Pontins headquarters were relocated to the Southport Holiday Park, Ainsdale in Southport. From the original Hemmings buy-out until then, the headquarters were at Sagar House in the village of Eccleston, Lancashire.

In September 2009, Pontins announced a five-year multi-million investment plan for the remaining five parks. Refurbishment work completed in 2010 included a new half-board restaurant and ice skating rink at the Prestatyn Sands Holiday Park, and a new roller skating rink at the Brean Sands Holiday Park. Proposals of re-building the Camber Sands and Southport Holiday Parks and doubling the capacity of the Pakefield Holiday Park were also made.

In November 2010, Pontins entered  administrative receivership and in January 2011, the company was bought out of receivership by Britannia Hotels. In 2014, the former Pontins resort at Sand Bay was purchased by the group and it became the sixth resort to be operated under the new Pontins brand.

Direct discrimination against Irish people

In March 2021, the i newspaper revealed an internal Pontins document listing surnames associated with "undesirable guests", all being common Irish surnames. This was done in order to filter out  bookings from gypsies and travellers. This was investigated by the Equality and Human Rights Commission (EHRC) who found Pontins was "directly discriminating on the basis of race" and breached the Equality Act 2010. The Britannia Hotel Group, which owns Pontins, signed an agreement with the EHRC promising to end the practice.

Current resorts 
 Brean Sands,  Burnham on Sea, Somerset
 Camber Sands, Camber, East Sussex
 Pakefield, Suffolk (adults-only)
 Prestatyn Sands Holiday Park, Wales
 Sand Bay, Weston-Super-Mare, Somerset (adults-only)
 Southport, Merseyside

Closed/Sold off resorts 
This is a list of some former Pontins resorts in both Ireland and the United Kingdom that have either closed or been sold off:

Barton Hall, Torquay, Devon; now a PGL site from 2010 (children's activity holidays) (formerly 3D Education)
Bay View, Brixham, Devon
Blackpool, Lancashire; (closed 2 October 2009); demolished and cleared, housing is now on the site
Bracklesham Bay, Chichester, West Sussex
Broadreeds, Selsey, West Sussex
Buckleigh Place, Westward Ho!, Devon
Dolphin Holiday Village, Brixham, Devon
Homelea Holiday Camp, Brixham, Devon
Hemsby, Norfolk; (closed January 2009); now owned by Northern Trust; as of 2023 it is back on the market
Jersey Holiday Village, Portelet Bay, Jersey
Little Canada, Wootton, Isle of Wight; now a PGL site (children's activity holidays) (formerly 3D Education)
Lydstep Haven, near Tenby, South Wales 
Middleton Tower, Heysham, Lancashire; site now a retirement village (opened 2007) 
Osmington Bay, Weymouth, Dorset; now a PGL site (children's activity holidays) (formerly 3D Education from 1995 to 2002)
Plemont Bay, Jersey
Pendine Sands, Carmarthenshire, South Wales
Riviera Chalet Hotel, Bowleaze Cove (near Preston), Weymouth, Dorset
Sands Hotel, Prestatyn, Denbighshire, North Wales
Sandy Bay, Northumberland
Seacroft, Hemsby, Norfolk, Opposite side of the road to the other Hemsby site. Since 1998, owned and run by Richardson's as Hemsby Beach Holiday Park
South Devon, Paignton, Devon
South Downs, Bracklesham Bay, near Chichester
St Mary's Bay, Brixham, Devon; now a Park Holidays UK site
Torbay Chalet Hotel, Paignton, Devon
Tower Beach, Prestatyn, Denbighshire, North Wales
Trabolgan, County Cork, Ireland; currently operating as "Trabolgan Holiday Village"
Wick Ferry, Christchurch, Dorset
Wall Park, Brixham, Left derelict for years once new owners closed the park. Now demolished and cleared for Devon housing.

In popular culture
The 1973 British film Holiday on the Buses was filmed at and set in the Prestatyn resort. A plaque was erected in 2004 at the main entrance gates (unchanged since the film was shot) to note this event. The same venue hosts professional snooker each year. Prestatyn Sands also hosts the finals for the annual Brass Band Festival; historically, the qualifying rounds were held in other Pontins centres.
The previous On The Buses film, Mutiny on the Buses (1972), depicted buses carrying adverts with the slogan "Go Pontinental", a chain of holiday villages set up in Continental Europe.
In November 2020, Liverpool-based indie band Courting released their fourth single 'Popshop!' which mentions the resort (in particular the Southport site) in its lyrics saying: "take the lads on tour, we'll go to Pontins."

Notes

References

External links
 UK Family Holidays and Short Breaks | Pontins

Tourism in the United Kingdom
Hospitality companies established in 1946
Travel and holiday companies of the United Kingdom
1946 establishments in England